Nikola Hristov Aslanov was a Bulgarian revolutionary, a worker of the Internal Macedonian-Adrianople Revolutionary Organization (IMARO).

Nikola Aslanov was born in 1875 in Kırk Kilise, (Lozengrad) East Thrace, today located in Turkey and known as Kirklareli. He worked as a merchant. In 1896, he became a member of the IMARO. In 1900 he was chosen as a member of the regional revolutionary committee in Lozengrad. In the same year, he got arrested by the Ottomans and imprisoned by the so-called Keremidchioglu Affair. Later Aslanov was tortured. He was sentenced to 10 years in prison and was exiled to the Payas Kale fortress in Anatolia, where he died in 1905.

References

1875 births
1905 deaths
People from Kırklareli
Bulgarian revolutionaries
Bulgarians from Eastern Thrace
Members of the Internal Macedonian Revolutionary Organization
Thracian Bulgarians
Bulgarian people imprisoned abroad
Prisoners who died in Ottoman detention
Bulgarian people who died in prison custody
19th-century Bulgarian people
Businesspeople from the Ottoman Empire